Highland Township is a township in Clayton County, Iowa, USA.  As of the 2019 census, its population was 249.

Geography
According to the USGS, it contains two cemeteries: Duff and Highland Lutheran.

References
 USGS Geographic Names Information System (GNIS)

External links
 US-Counties.com
 City-Data.com

Townships in Clayton County, Iowa
Townships in Iowa